Neoplatyura is a genus of flies belonging to the family Keroplatidae.

The species of this genus are found in Europe, Australia and Northern America.

Species
 Neoplatyura anjouana Matile, 1979 
 Neoplatyura annieae Matile, 1988

References

Keroplatidae
Sciaroidea genera
Taxa named by John Russell Malloch